Maciej Fałkowski is a Polish diplomat, since 2019, serving as ambassador to Iran.

Life 
Maciej Fałkowski holds an M.A. in law from the Catholic University of Lublin. He has been studying also ADR at the Toronto University (2007), Executive MBA the Warsaw University of Technology (2009), and PhD studies the Warsaw School of Economics (2013).

In 1998, Fałkowski joined the Ministry of Foreign Affairs. He has been working at the embassy in Oslo and representative to the United Nations in Vienna. He was an expert and the head of the unit for export controls and conventional disarmament at the Security Policy Department. Between 2003 and 2007 he served as a consular officer in Toronto. In 2013–2014 he was a deputy director of the Asia Pacific Department. From 2015 to 2019 he was the deputy director and director of the Economic Cooperation Department. In 2018, he became a member of Advisory Council to the Polish Space Agency. Since 8 June 2019 he is representing Poland as an ambassador to Iran. He presented his credentials to the president Hassan Rouhani on 17 June 2019.

Beside Polish, he speaks English, German, and French. He is married, with a child.

References 

20th-century births
Ambassadors of Poland to Iran
Living people
John Paul II Catholic University of Lublin alumni
Year of birth missing (living people)